Debra Wilson (born April 26, 1962), also known as Debra Wilson Skelton or Debra Skelton, is an American actress and comedian. She is known for being the longest-serving original cast member on the sketch comedy series Mad TV, having appeared on the show's first eight seasons from 1995 to 2003. As a voice actress, she has voiced various characters on television, including Ramaraffe on Mao Mao: Heroes of Pure Heart (2019-2020), Grandma Shark on Baby Shark's Big Show! (2020–present), and Kira on Dogs in Space (2021–present). She has voiced multiple characters on series such as Black Dynamite (2012–2015), All Hail King Julien (2014–2016), and Spitting Image (2020–2022). She also starred in the films The Summerland Project (2016) and Bodied (2017).

Wilson has had lead voice roles in video games such as Rebecca Thane in Mirror's Edge Catalyst (2016), Amanda Waller in Batman: The Enemy Within (2017–2018) and Suicide Squad: Kill the Justice League (2023), Grace Walker in the Wolfenstein series (2017–2019), General Lyons in Call of Duty: Modern Warfare (2019), Sophia Akande in The Outer Worlds (2019), Cere Junda in Star Wars Jedi: Fallen Order (2019), Kit in Ratchet & Clank: Rift Apart (2021), Savathûn in Destiny 2 (2021–2022), Harbinger in Halo Infinite (2021), Renata Glasc in League of Legends (2022–present). 

In 2022, Wilson became the sixth official voice of Daisy Duck, making her the first African-American performer of the character.

Early life
Wilson was born and raised in New York City, in the neighborhood of Ozone Park, Queens, and attended the New York City High School of the Performing Arts. After graduation, she studied television and radio broadcasting at Syracuse University. She worked as a preschool teacher during the 1980s for the All Saints Church, in Sunnyside, Queens.

Wilson made her television acting debut on The Apollo Comedy Hour and The Uptown Comedy Club, where she became a series regular. She also co-hosted Can We Shop? with Joan Rivers. She continued her work in television working as a spokesperson for Burger King, and guest starring in New York Undercover.

Career

Mad TV
Wilson was one of the original eight cast members of Mad TV when the series aired in 1995. Wilson came to the show with a background in sketch comedy, improv and television.

Wilson was credited for creating some of the most popular recurring characters on the show. Among her characters were Latina bimbo Melina (Lida and Melina), Reality Check'''s Tovah McQueen, Stick Chick Autumn, Kappa Kappa Kappa sorority sister Hayden Brooks, Alexis Dubane (Prehistoric Glamazon Huntresses), blaxploitation actress Cocoa Latette (Son of Dolemite), Lowered Expectations Host and Ms. Not Nice (Jenny Jones). Perhaps her best known character was the fast talking "Black American Princess" Bunifa Latifah Halifah Sharifa Jackson.

Her most recognized impressions on the show were of Oprah Winfrey and Whitney Houston. Her Oprah impersonation is so well regarded that in fact she has played Oprah or Oprah-like characters in other media, most notably Scary Movie 4 and The Proud Family. She also regularly portrayed Beyoncé Knowles, Mariah Carey, Lil' Kim, and Chris Tucker.

Television projects
Since her debut on MADtv, Wilson has done voice acting on episodes on numerous television shows, landing some recurring roles on such shows as Clone High, Family Guy, and did puppeteer work on The Mr. Potato Head Show. She voiced Captain Lisa Cusak in the Star Trek: Deep Space Nine episode "The Sound of Her Voice".

Wilson has made numerous independent films, including Naked Angel, Jane White Is Sick and Twisted, Skin Deep, and Soulmates. She was also in an episode of Without a Trace as a doctor, and appeared three times as a working girl, Divine, in episodes of CSI: Crime Scene Investigation.

She and Sullivan have done commercials for Pepsi's Sierra Mist. She appeared as herself on the February 15, 1999, episode of WCW Monday Nitro accompanying MADtv castmate Will Sasso in his professional wrestling match against Bret Hart. She also appeared on the UK Whose Line Is It Anyway? – Season 10, Episode 9.

She was the co-host of TV Guide Channel's TV Watercooler with John Fugelsang, until she was replaced by Teresa Strasser in October 2006. She was also a co-host on GSN Live until she left in January 2010.

Wilson is currently the announcer of the revival of the NBC game show Weakest Link hosted by Jane Lynch.

In July 2022, Nickelodeon announced that Wilson would voice the character Headless Headmistress Bloodgood in the 2022 animated reboot series Monster High.

As of 2022, Wilson voices Daisy Duck, replacing Tress MacNeille.

Theater projects
Wilson performed off-Broadway with the improvisational comedy troupe Noo Yawk Tawk directed by Richmond Shepard at The Village Gate Theater (1988–1991).

Video games
Wilson has voiced many video game characters, such as her role as Grace Walker in Wolfenstein II: The New Colossus and her role as Cere Junda in Star Wars Jedi: Fallen Order. She also appeared in Call of Duty: Modern Warfare as General Lyons. Her other video game voice work includes The Outer Worlds, Gears 5, Wolfenstein: Youngblood, Rage 2, Days Gone and Far Cry New Dawn. She is the voice of Draka in World of Warcraft: Shadowlands. She is the voice of Savathûn in Destiny 2 and the Harbinger in Halo Infinite''.

Personal life
Wilson married writer and director Cliff Skelton in April 2006. They separated in 2010 citing irreconcilable differences.

Filmography

Film

Television

Theatre

Video games

Web series

References

External links
 
 

Living people
20th-century American actresses
20th-century American comedians
21st-century American actresses
21st-century American comedians
Actresses from New York City
African-American actresses
African-American female comedians
African-American television personalities
American film actresses
American puppeteers
American sketch comedians
American stage actresses
American television actresses
Television personalities from New York City
American women comedians
American women television personalities
American voice actresses
Comedians from New York City
Fiorello H. LaGuardia High School alumni
Game show announcers
People from Ozone Park, Queens
Syracuse University alumni
20th-century African-American women
21st-century African-American women
21st-century African-American people
1962 births